The London Borough of Barking and Dagenham is a London borough in East London. It lies around 9 miles (14.4 km) east of Central London. It is an Outer London borough and the south is within the London Riverside section of the Thames Gateway; an area designated as a national priority for urban regeneration. At the 2011 census it had a population of 187,000, the majority of which are within the Becontree estate. The borough's three main towns are Barking, Chadwell Heath and Dagenham. The local authority is the Barking and Dagenham London Borough Council. Barking and Dagenham was one of six London boroughs to host the 2012 Summer Olympics.

History
The London Borough of Barking was formed in 1965 by the London Government Act 1963. It covered almost all the area  of the Municipal Borough of Barking and the greater part of the area of the Municipal Borough of Dagenham, both of which were abolished by the same act. At the time of its creation the combined population of Barking and Dagenham was around 180,000, the northern tip of Dagenham having been incorporated into Redbridge and a small area of Barking in Newham. The borough was renamed Barking and Dagenham in 1980. In 1994, the borough was expanded to cover the Becontree estate that until then had been within the Borough of Redbridge. The area covered by Mayesbrook Park  in the Borough was once part of the historic Manor of Jenkins, seat of the Fanshawe family.

Historic records of the London Borough of Barking and Dagenham and predecessor bodies the Borough of Barking and the  Borough of Dagenham are held at the Barking and Dagenham Archive Service, Valence House Museum.

There are a total of 52 listed buildings located within the borough's boundaries. The Grade I and Grade II* listed buildings in the borough include Eastbury Manor House, the Church of Peter and Paul, Dagenham and Valence House.

Boundaries
The borough borders the London Borough of Havering to the east with the River Rom forming part of the boundary. It borders the London Borough of Newham to the west with the River Roding forming much of the border. To the south is the River Thames which forms the borough's boundary with the London Borough of Bexley and the Royal Borough of Greenwich. To the north the borough forms a thin protrusion between Havering and the London Borough of Redbridge in order to encompass Chadwell Heath. 530 hectares within the borough are designated as part of the Metropolitan Green Belt.

Geography

The borough's major districts include Barking, Becontree and Dagenham. It borders five other London boroughs: Newham, Redbridge, Havering, and Greenwich and Bexley to the south of the Thames.

Much of the housing of the borough was constructed by the London County Council during the interwar period of 1921–1939. Major settlement of the area, mostly escaping slum conditions in the East End of London, occurred during this period when the new motor and chemical industries such as the Ford Motor Company plant at Dagenham were set up. Since the decline of these industries in the 1980s, employment has shifted towards service sector jobs. There are large areas of logistics and warehouse development around the A13 road. Much of the borough is within the London Riverside area of the Thames Gateway zone and is the site of considerable house building and other development, such as Beam Park. A £500 million budget has been earmarked for redevelopment of the borough's principal district of Barking.

Demographics

In 1801, the civil parishes that form the modern borough had a total population of 1,937; and the area was characterised by farming, woodland and the fishing fleet at Barking. This last industry employed 1,370 men and boys by 1850, but by the end of the century had ceased to exist; replaced by train deliveries of fresh fish from the East Coast ports. The population rose slowly through the 19th century, as the district became built up; and new industries developed around Barking.

The population rose dramatically between 1921 and 1931, when the London County Council developed the Becontree Estate. This public housing development of 27,000 homes housed over 100,000 people, split between the then urban district councils of Ilford, Dagenham and Barking. People were rehoused from the slums of the East End. In 1931, the Ford Motor Company relocated to a  site at Dagenham, and in 1932 the District line was extended to Upminster; bringing further development to the area.

After World War II, further public housing projects were built to rehouse the many Londoners made homeless in the Blitz. As industry declined during the 1960s, the population entered a long decline, but has now begun to rise again with new housing developments on brownfield sites. In 2013 Barking and Dagenham has England's highest fertility rate: 2.58.

At the time of the 2011 census, 49.5% of the borough's community identified themselves as white British. Barking and Dagenham has been strongly affected by immigration, with the white British population having dropped 30.6% from 2001 to 2011 - the second largest decrease in the country, behind neighbouring Newham. The population of non-UK born residents increasing by 205%. The largest decrease of White British occurred in the Longbridge ward (79.8% in 2001 to 35% in 2011), and the Abbey ward, which contains the main Barking area (from 46.2% to 15.8%). The smallest decrease was in the Eastbrook ward. The largest minority communities were of Black and Asian heritage.

Barking and Dagenham had by far the largest decrease of the 65+ population, having dropped almost 20% between 2001 and 2011. There were 69,700 households in the borough in 2011, up 3.6% from 2001. The borough also had the largest proportion of school-age (5-19) population of all the local authorities in England and Wales, 21.4%, at the 2011 census. The borough's pre-school (0-4) population rose by 49.1% from 2001 to 2011, by far the largest increase in London.

The following table shows the ethnic group of respondents in the 2001 and 2011 census in Barking and Dagenham.

Ethnicity

Governance

The borough is covered by two parliamentary constituencies: Barking and  Dagenham and Rainham (first contested in 2010). The borough is within the City and East London Assembly constituency, returning Unmesh Desai as the directly elected Assembly Member.

Prior to Brexit in 2020, Barking and Dagenham was part of the London constituency in the European Parliament.

Barking and Dagenham London Borough Council has a mayor, who is elected at the council annual general meeting by councillors. The officeholder must be a serving councillor, although the role of mayor is non-political. The mayor chairs council meetings and performs ceremonial duties in the borough.

There are 17 wards in the borough, each returning 3 councillors, making 51 in total. As of the Barking and Dagenham London Borough Council election in 2022, all 51 council seats are held by the Labour Party.

Twin cities
London Borough of Barking and Dagenham is twinned with:
 Witten, North Rhine-Westphalia, Germany
 Tczew, Pomeranian Voivodeship, Poland

Education

There are many schools and further education facilities in the borough. Situated near the Town Hall, the Barking Learning Centre is a learning facility providing a range of courses leading to recognised qualifications. It also includes a library with free public internet access, the council's first One Stop Shop, conference and meeting space, a gallery and a café. A study in 2017 found that nearly half of Barking & Dagenham's 19 year olds lack Level 3 qualifications (A Level equivalent) which was the highest figure in London.

CU London, a Higher Education institute owned and governed by Coventry University, started offering courses to students in September 2017. Situated in the former Dagenham Civic Centre, they offer a range of subjects across Foundation, HNC, HND and degree level.

The University of East London formerly had a campus in the borough, however this has now closed with all campuses now being located in the neighbouring borough of Newham.

Transport
In March 2011, the main forms of transport that residents used to travel to work were: driving a car or van, 22.5% of all residents aged 16–74; underground, metro, light rail, tram, 7.5%; bus, minibus or coach, 7.5%; train, 7.3%; on foot, 3.7%; passenger in a car or van, 1.7%; work mainly at or from home, 1.3%.

Rail 
Barking and Dagenham is served by both the London Underground and National Rail networks. On the London Underground, the Borough is served by both  Hammersmith & City Line, and District Line trains.

National Rail c2c trains call at Dagenham Dock and Barking railway stations. Most c2c trains terminate at London Fenchurch Street, whilst to the east, trains serve Grays, Southend and Shoeburyness in Essex. 

Barking and - from summer 2022 - Barking Riverside railway stations are served by the London Overground with frequent services to Gospel Oak in the London Borough of Camden.

The Elizabeth Line serves Chadwell Heath railway station, which straddles the border between Redbridge and the borough. 

Hammersmith & City Line services terminate at Barking. Some District Line services terminate at Barking, but many also call at Upney, Becontree, Dagenham Heathway and Dagenham East in the Borough. Some services terminate at Dagenham East.

Bus 
Several London Buses serve the Borough. Night buses N15 and N86 travel into Central London, Stratford, Romford and Harold Hill every night.

Cycling 
Cycle Superhighway 3 begins in Barking, to the south of Greatfields Park, linking the Borough to Canary Wharf, the City of London and the City of Westminster via a bike freeway, most of which is segregated from other road traffic. TfL plan to extend the cycle network to Barking Riverside in the future, for which the first consultations closed in winter 2019.

Roads 
Two major A-roads cross the Borough: the A12 and A13.

The A12 has one junction in the Borough, to the north of Chadwell Heath. To the west, the A12 carries traffic through Newbury Park towards the North Circular, Stratford and Central London. To the east, the A12 heads through Romford towards the M25 and south and east Essex.

The A13 is named Alfred's Way as it enters the Borough to the west. Crossing Barking and Dagenham, the dual carriageway can be accessed via several grade-separated junctions. Leaving the Borough to the west via the A13 will lead to the Docklands and the City of London. To the east, the A13 passes Rainham and the M25 before traffic heads into south Essex.

Other A-roads cross the Borough, including the A118, A124, A1112 and A1306, although these roads are smaller and generally carry less traffic.

Local media 
Time 107.5 FM broadcasts local news from nearby Romford.

Bedrock  is the local Hospital radio service available on-line and broadcasts a range of health related information focused around the local Hospitals; King George Hospital and Queen's Hospital.

Barking & Dagenham News, a hyperlocal news service distributes news, weather, travel, sport and entertainment updates on Facebook Watch.

London Fire Brigade
The London Borough of Barking and Dagenham has two fire stations within its boundary: Barking and Dagenham. Barking fire station operates two pumping appliances, a bulk foam unit and a command unit. The support units that are operated here will cover a large selection of station grounds and areas. Dagenham fire station operates two pumping appliances and a hydraulic platform.

Of the two stations; Dagenham is the busier, attending over 2,000 incidents in 2006/2007.

Coat of arms

The coat of arms of the borough displays the Curfew tower of Barking Abbey in its crest.

Freedom of the Borough
The following people and military units have received the Freedom of the Borough of Barking and Dagenham.

Individuals
 George Shaw: 1992.
 Charles J. Fairbrass : 1992.
Stephen R Thompson MBE 2008
 Sandie Shaw : 28 April 2021.
 Claire Symonds : 28 April 2021.
 Paul Ince: 23 September 2021.
 Trevor Lock: 23 September 2021.
 Dora Challingsworth: 23 September 2021.

Military Units
 The Royal Anglian Regiment: February 2010.

See also

List of people from Barking and Dagenham

References

External links
Barking and Dagenham Council
NHS Barking and Dagenham
Borough of Dagenham historic records
Borough of Barking historic records

 
Barking and Dagenham
Barking and Dagenham
1965 establishments in the United Kingdom